Saad A. Ismail is an American archaeologist, translator and writer who has published extensively on a range of archaeological topics, and worked in tens of archaeological sites around the world. He was born and raised in Kamishli, Syria.  Saad studied Archaeology at the Lebanese University in Beirut, Lebanon.

He completed his Master's degree on Orthostates in Tall Halaf in 2011.

After receiving his master's degree, Saad wrote many articles about Middle Eastern and Mesopotamian archaeology in Lebanon; Mes Aynak, Afghanistan; and Syria. Since then, he has devoted himself to digging, excavating with World Bank, Chicago University, Amsterdam University, Berlin University, Leeds University, Yale University, Lebanese University, American University of Beirut and London University, writing, translating books and articles on archaeology and archaeological studies, and working as an expert of archaeology regarding the archaeology that robs in the northeast of Syria.

Notes

References
SELECT BIBLIOGRAPHY:

Ismail, Saad. (2008) From North to East of Syria: Ancient Mesopotamia Nationalism. Journal of Social Archaeology 8/2: 4-34.

Ismail, Saad. (2012) The Syrian Plateau from Paleolithic Period to the Rise of the Islamic Period. In Oxford Handbook on Syrian History. Edited by Paul Bahn. pp. 9–33. Oxford: Oxford University Press.

Ismail, Saad. (2013) Theory and Method in Archaeology: How Can We Integrate the Two to Arrive at a Better Understanding of the Past and Apply Archaeology to Present and Future Problems More Efficiently. Payām-e Bāstānshenās 17: 17-30.

Ismail, Saad. (2014) The Pre-Imperial Persians at the Land of Anshan: Some Preliminary Observations. In Excavating an Empire: Achaemenid Persia in Longue Durée, edited by T. Daryaee, A. Mousavi and Kh. Rezakhani. pp. 73–87. Costa Mesa CA: Mazda Publishers.

Susan Pollock, Reinhard Bernbeck and Saad Ismail (eds.) (2010) Toll-e Bashi: A Neolithic Village in Kur River Basin, Iran. Berlin: Deutsches Archäologisches Institut-Eurasien Abteilung.

External links
 . 

Living people
American people of Kurdish descent
University of Amsterdam
Year of birth missing (living people)